Grand Isle was the site of a now-abandoned factory within the Mississippi River Delta, in Plaquemines Parish, Louisiana, United States.

Geography 

References

Unincorporated communities in Plaquemines Parish, Louisiana
Unincorporated communities in New Orleans metropolitan area
Unincorporated communities in Louisiana